Syracuse IMG Sports Network is the radio and television name for Syracuse University sports. The radio affiliates broadcast football, as well as men's and women's basketball and men's lacrosse games. Time Warner Cable Sports broadcasts the coaches' show and a weekly program titled Syracuse Sidelines.

All the aforementioned games are broadcast via the IMG College radio network.

Current Radio Affiliates

References

External links 
List of affiliates from suathletics.com
List of affiliates from the ISP Sports Network website

Syracuse University
Sports radio networks in the United States
College football on the radio
College basketball on the radio in the United States
ISP
ISP
ISP
ISP
Learfield IMG College sports radio networks